Microsoft Explorer may refer to the following products by Microsoft:

 Internet Explorer, a web browser included with Microsoft Windows operating systems
 Windows Explorer, a file manager system in Microsoft Windows operating systems